Vanda testacea is a species of orchid occurring from the Indian subcontinent to Indochina at the elevations of 500 to 2000 meters. It is an epiphytic perennial. It flowers in 6–20 flowered racemes; flowers range in size from 1 to 1.5 cm. Flowers are yellow with a blue lip.

External links 

testacea